Ghias ol Din (also Romanized as Ghīās̄ ol Dīn, Ghīās̄ od Dīn, and Ghīās̄ ed Dīn) is a village in Mud Rural District, Mud District, Sarbisheh County, South Khorasan Province, Iran. At the 2006 census, its population was 33, in 9 families.

References 

Populated places in Sarbisheh County